Ronald Graeme Jenyns (born 25 February 1936) is a former Australian Olympic sailor. He competed in the Finn class at the 1960 and 1968 Summer Olympic games, finishing in fourth position both times.

He later worked in the game fishing industry in northern Queensland.

References

External links

1936 births
Living people
Australian male sailors (sport)
Olympic sailors of Australia
Sailors at the 1960 Summer Olympics – Finn
Sailors at the 1968 Summer Olympics – Finn
20th-century Australian people